Clive Bradley may refer to:

 Clive Bradley (musician) (1936–2005), Trinidadian arranger of steelpan music
 Clive Bradley (screenwriter) (born 1959), British screenwriter